Guangxi Zhuang Autonomous Region, an autonomous region of the People's Republic of China, is made up of the following three levels of administrative division.

Administrative divisions
All of these administrative divisions are explained in greater detail at administrative divisions of China. This chart lists only prefecture-level and county-level divisions of Guangxi.

Recent changes in administrative divisions

Population composition

Prefectures

Counties

References

 
Guangxi